Gampaha electoral district is one of the 22 multi-member electoral districts of Sri Lanka created by the 1978 Constitution of Sri Lanka. The district is conterminous with the administrative district of Gampaha in the Western province. The district currently elects 18 of the 225 members of the Sri Lankan Parliament and had 1,785,964 registered electors in 2020.

Presidential Elections

1982 presidential election
Results of the 1st presidential election held on 20 October 1982 for the district:

1988 presidential election
Results of the 2nd presidential election held on 19 December 1988 for the district:

1994 presidential election
Results of the 3rd presidential election held on 9 November 1994 for the district:

1999 presidential election
Results of the 4th presidential election held on 21 December 1999 for the district:

2005 presidential election
Results of the 5th presidential election held on 17 November 2005 for the district:

2010 presidential election
Results of the 6th presidential election held on 26 January 2010 for the district:

2015 presidential election
Results of the 7th presidential election held on 8 January 2015:

2019 presidential election
Results of the 8th presidential election held on 16 November 2019:

Parliamentary Elections

1989 parliamentary general election
Results of the 9th parliamentary election held on 15 February 1989 for the district:

1994 parliamentary general election
Results of the 10th parliamentary election held on 16 August 1994 for the district:

2000 parliamentary general election
Results of the 11th parliamentary election held on 10 October 2000 for the district:

2001 parliamentary general election
Results of the 12th parliamentary election held on 5 December 2001 for the district:

2004 parliamentary general election
Results of the 13th parliamentary election held on 2 April 2004 for the district:

2010 parliamentary general election
Results of the 14th parliamentary election held on 8 April 2010 for the district:

2015 parliamentary general election
Results of the 15th parliamentary election held on 17 August 2015:

2020 parliamentary general election
Results of the 16th parliamentary election held on 5 August 2020:

Provincial Council Elections

1988 provincial council election
Results of the 1st Western provincial council election held on 2 June 1988 for the district:

1993 provincial council election
Results of the 2nd Western provincial council election held on 17 May 1993 for the district:

1999 provincial council election
Results of the 3rd Western provincial council election held on 6 April 1999 for the district:

2004 provincial council election
Results of the 4th Western provincial council election held on 10 July 2004 for the district:

2009 provincial council election
Results of the 5th Western provincial council election held on 25 April 2009 for the district:

Notes

References

Electoral districts of Sri Lanka
Politics of Gampaha District